The 1997 Rhein Fire season was the third season for the franchise in the World League of American Football (WLAF). The team was led by head coach Galen Hall in his third year, and played its home games at Rheinstadion in Düsseldorf, Germany. They finished the regular season in first place with a record of seven wins and three losses, marking the first winning season in franchise history. In World Bowl '97, Rhein lost to the Barcelona Dragons 38–24. Quarterback T. J. Rubley earned all-World League honors and was named the league's offensive most valuable player.

Offseason

World League draft

Personnel

Staff

Roster

Schedule

Standings

Game summaries

Week 1: vs Barcelona Dragons

Week 2: vs London Monarchs

Week 3: at Scottish Claymores

Week 4: at Amsterdam Admirals

Week 5: vs Frankfurt Galaxy

Week 6: at Frankfurt Galaxy

Week 7: vs Scottish Claymores

Week 8: at Barcelona Dragons

Week 9: vs Amsterdam Admirals

Week 10: at London Monarchs

World Bowl '97

Awards
After the completion of the regular season, the All-World League team was selected by members of the media. Overall, Rhein had six players selected. The selections were:

 T. J. Rubley, quarterback
 Bill Schroeder, wide receiver
 Ethan Brooks, offensive tackle
 Mike Sheldon, guard
 Bob Kronenberg, center
 Spencer Folau, offensive tackle

Additionally, Rubley was selected offensive MVP by the six World League head coaches. Galen Hall earned Coach of the Year honors.

Notes

References

Rhein Fire seasons
Rhein
Rhein